The 1994 Winter Olympics, officially known by the International Olympic Committee as the XVII Olympic Winter Games, were a multi-sport event held in Lillehammer, Norway, from February 12 through February 27, 1994. A total of 1738 athletes representing 67 National Olympic Committees (NOCs) participated at the Games in 61 events across 12 disciplines.

Alpine skiing

Biathlon

Bobsleigh

Cross-country skiing

Figure skating

Freestyle skiing

Ice hockey

Luge

Nordic combined

Short track speed skating

Ski jumping

Speed skating

Medal leaders
Athletes that won at least two gold medals or at least three total medals are listed below.

See also
1994 Winter Olympics medal table

References

External links

Medal winners
1994
Norway sport-related lists